Wang Ju-Rong (Xiao'erjing: , 1928–2006) was a Chinese-Muslim martial artist and Wushu professor in the Shanghai Institute of Physical Education.

A longtime promoter of Wushu, a teacher, an organizational officer, and a Wushu event-announcer, she was the first woman who was a certified judge of national ranking for both Wushu and Archery. Wang was also the founder of the Flying Rainbow Fan art.

Family life
Wang Ju-Rong was the daughter of Wang Zi-Ping, a renowned figure in Chinese Martial Arts and Traditional Medicine. In 1955 Wang married Wu Chengde, who was a student of her father, a doctor and a professor of Traditional Chinese Medicine. She had three daughters Helen Wu (XiaoRong), Grace Wu (XiaoGo) and Wu Xiaoping.

Education
Wang began her Wushu training at age five studying with her father Wang Zi-Ping. She learned Tan Tui, Chaquan, Huaquan, Bajiquan, Pao Chuan and Taijiquan (T'ai chi ch'uan). As a child Wang would train six hours a day, including training Pai Dai (body striking) with her mostly male classmates. Though it was a peculiar request,  her father also allowed her to learn the Kwan Do (heavy broadsword) as her first weapon.  In 1952 Wang graduated from Aurora University in Shanghai.

Professorship and research
Wang Ju-Rong became a founding professor of the East China Physical Education College (Shanghai Physical Education College). Teaching there for 36 years and conducting research in the field of Chinese martial arts, including Shaolin, Wudangquan, Taijiquan, Tongbeiquan and Nanquan. She was interested in not only their techniques but also their theory.

The first graduate program was also developed  at the college by her and she was the first professor to have two students earn a 'Masters of Martial Arts' degree in Taijiquan.

Accomplishments
Wang is a wushu champion athlete and coach, her professional accomplishments include:

 Women's Championship at the 7th National Athletic Games (1946)
 Gold Medal for Chaquan routine
 Women's Championship at the National Wushu Competition (1953)
 Gold Medal for Green Dragon Sword Technique
 First female coach of New China Wushu Team with Wang Zi-ping (1960)
 Director of the Chinese Martial Arts Association and Archery Association
 Vice-Chairman of the Shanghai Wushu Association, head of the Judging Committee
 Vice-Chairman of theShanghai Archery Association
 President of the Chinese Martial Arts Research Institute
 Advisor to the Wu Dang Research Association
 Advisor Shanghai Qi Gong Research Association
 Advisor United States Kungfu Federation
 Advisor US Kuoshu Federation
 Honorary Advisor Chinese Wushu History Association
 Women of the Year Inside Kung-fu Magazine (1995)
 Lifetime Achievement Award from the United States Wushu Kungfu Federation (1997)

Flying Rainbow Fan
The Flying Rainbow Fan form was developed by Wang Ju-Rong. The seven series of this form combine the styles of T'ai chi, Bagua and Kungfu.

Wang Ju-Rong describes the Flying Rainbow Fan in her own words:
I included the following elements: unification of stillness and motion, the mutual coordination of yi and qi, the harmony of the six internal and external components, strength building movements, practical applications, and artistic expression. These elements allow men, women and children of all ages to be able to grasp, and attain a strong healthy body. Through the combined internal and external training, one can achieve the goal of eliminating illness and extending years.

Flying Rainbow Fan is a current form in Wushu practice and in competition. It is taught by Wang Ju-Rong's daughters Grace Wu and Helen Wu.

References

1928 births
2006 deaths
Chinese wushu practitioners
Chinese Muslims
Hui people